Arensi Rota (born 7 December 1995) is a Greek professional footballer who plays as a defender for Italian  club Alessandria.

Club career
On 25 August 2022, Rota signed a two-year contract with Alessandria.

References

External links

1995 births
Living people
Footballers from Korçë
Albanian footballers
Greek footballers
Association football defenders
Football League (Greece) players
Aris Thessaloniki F.C. players
Panargiakos F.C. players
Panegialios F.C. players
Serie C players
S.S. Monopoli 1966 players
Carrarese Calcio players
U.S. Alessandria Calcio 1912 players
Greek expatriate footballers
Albanian expatriate footballers
Greek expatriate sportspeople in Italy
Albanian expatriate sportspeople in Italy
Expatriate footballers in Italy